Dunavac (Serbian Cyrillic: Дунавац) is a suburban settlement of Belgrade, the capital of Serbia. It is located in the Belgrade's municipality of Palilula. The word literally means "Little Danube"

Location
Dunavac is located in the northern, Banat section of the municipality, 31 kilometer north of downtown Belgrade and only 5 kilometer away from the small town of Opovo, a municipal seat in the South Banat District in Vojvodina. The settlement is located on the Zrenjaninski put road which connects Belgrade with the town of Zrenjanin, also in Vojvodina.

Population
The settlement originated after 1947 when mass melioration works began in the marsh of Pančevački Rit, in the extreme northern part of which Dunavac is located. It is a small, slightly depopulating settlement with a population of 618 by the 1991 census and 603 by the 2002 census. Population is made mostly of Serbs (91.87% in 2002).

Characteristics
Name dunavac originates from the small stream on which the settlement was built, less than 1 kilometer from the Danube's left bank and means the small Danube, which is a common name for arms of the Danube in Slavic countries.

Dunavac administratively comprises the settlement of Besni Fok which is totally separated from it and 9 kilometers away from it. As both settlements are small, they don't make one continuous built-up area.

See also
List of Belgrade neighborhoods

Suburbs of Belgrade
Populated places in Serbian Banat
Palilula, Belgrade